Garden City, Georgia was incorporated on February 8, 1939.  It operates under a council-administrator form of government.  By 2011, its city council will be composed of one mayor and five city council members.  Each of the councillors will represent a different section of town.

The current mayor is Tennyson Holder.  Re-elected to the city council in 2009, he was appointed by his colleagues to serve the remainder the Anthony "Andy" Quinney’s unexpired mayoral term.

As of 2010, Garden City has never collected property taxes.

Council Meetings

The Council meets on the first and the third Mondays of each month at 7:00 p.m.  Meetings have taken place at:

 Garden City Community House, 78 Varnedoe Avenue, from 1951 until 1963
 Garden City City Hall, 100 Main Street, from 1963 to 2009 
 Garden City Town Center, 100 Central Avenue, since 2009

Mayors

Until 2003, the mayor and the council members were elected to two-year terms of office.  In 2003, staggered four-year terms were introduced.

Past and presents mayors are:

Color code:

Council Members

Past and present council members are:

Footnotes

See also
 Garden City, Georgia
 Savannah, Georgia
 Mayors of Savannah, Georgia

Garden City, Georgia